HMAS Paluma was a survey vessel that was operated by the Royal Australian Navy during World War II.

Construction
The launch Paluma was built by Taylor's Slipway at Townsville, Australia, in 1941.

Service history
Paluma was requisitioned for wartime use on 11 September 1941 and purchased on 1 June 1942. The launch was being used as the examination and patrol vessel at Thursday Island when offered to meet a requirement for seaworthy small ships to insert Coastwatchers and gather intelligence for a proposed Allied offensive against Rabaul. The Japanese move from Rabaul on New Guinea forestalled any Allied attack on Rabaul and shifted focus to a counter offensive in New Guinea.

The prewar sea route to the north coast of New Guinea, particularly the Buna area of planned operations, had been closed by the Japanese advance and naval control of open waters leaving only an inshore route described by MacArthur's Chief of Transportation, as "the most dangerous coastline in the world" and essentially uncharted. In October 1942, all the vessels of the US Army Small Ships Section, largely crewed by Australians, had been ordered to Milne Bay to support the operations against Japanese in the Buna area. Those small vessels, in their night runs to Oro Bay, had begun noting channels and marking reefs with oil drums. The small ships could not support the beachhead, being largely supported by air, with heavy equipment and supplies so that a way for large ships had to be found.

Paluma, under the command of Lieutenant Ivan Champion RANVR, was assigned to survey a reliable, large vessel, route from Milne Bay to Oro Bay. In addition to surveys, the vessel was to install lights, land shore parties under Captain J . K. McCarthy for reconnaissance, establish radio stations and pilot ships through discovered channels. Immediately after Karsik's passage the regular convoys code named Operation Lilliput began operations.

Paluma was awarded the battle honour "New Guinea 1942–43".

Fate

After service she was returned to her owners in Townsville. It was used for scheduled trips to Palm Island, and irregular charters. It sat idle in Ross Creek during the 1980s, next to the Flinders Street ferry terminal. The vessel was refitted in 1990 to be used for charters, although it did not pass survey. Paluma burnt to the waterline near Airlie Beach in the 1990s.

References

Bibliography

External links
Magnetic Island Boat Paluma Was Once A Support Vessel For The Coastwatchers During WW2 (Photos)

1941 ships
Auxiliary ships of the Royal Australian Navy
Survey ships of the Royal Australian Navy